Club de Madrid is an independent non-profit organization created to promote democracy and change in the international community. Composed of 121 regular members from 72 countries, including 7 Nobel Peace Prize laureates and 20 first female heads of State or Government, the Club de Madrid is the world's largest forum of former heads of state and government.

Among its main goals are the strengthening of democratic institutions and counseling on the resolution of political conflicts in two key areas: democratic leadership and governance, and response to crisis and post-crisis situations.

Club de Madrid works together with governments, inter-governmental organizations, civil society, scholars, and representatives from the business world, to encourage dialogue to foster social and political change. The Club de Madrid also searches for effective methods to provide technical advice and recommendations to nations that are taking steps to establish democracy.

Actions 
The Club of Madrid pushed for a constitutional reform in Haiti and promoted the adoption of a National Pact in 2014 to reach a democratic consensus.

In June 2022, the Club of Madrid called on the Tunisian President Kais Saied to release the politician Hamadi Jebali.

Composition
As of May 2022, there are 121 full members, all of whom are previous government officials with full voting rights. The club also has institutional members and foundations – private and public organizations that share similar democratic objectives, including FRIDE, the Gorbachev Foundation of North America (GFNA), both original sponsors of the founding conference in 2001, the Madrid City Council, the Regional Government of Madrid, and the Government of Spain. Additionally, there are six honorary members (e.g. Kofi Annan, Aung San Suu Kyi) and several fellows, who are experts on democratic change.

The club is based in Madrid (Spain), although meetings are held worldwide. Currently, Vaira Vīķe-Freiberga, the former President of Latvia (1999–2007), is the organization's president, and it has two vice presidents: Jenny Shipley (New Zealand) and Jorge Fernando Quiroga (Bolivia). A former president of the Club of Madrid is Wim Kok (2009–2013).

The club was created from an event that was held in October 2001 in Madrid, a four-day Conference on Democratic Transition and Consolidation (CDTC). This event brought together 35 world leaders, over 100 academics, and policy specialists from Europe, the Americas, Asia, and Africa to discuss ideas and a means of implementation from both objective and subjective perspectives. The conference discussed eight main topics:
  Constitutional design
  The Legislative branch and its relation with the Executive branch
  The Judicial branch and its relation with the Executive branch
  Anti-corruption procedures
  The role of the armed forces and security forces
  Reform of the state bureaucracy
  Strengthening of political and social pluralism and political parties
  Economic and social conditions

Structure and organization
The Club de Madrid's primary asset is its membership, which includes 95 distinguished former heads of state and government of democratic nations. The comparative advantage of the Club de Madrid is based on the following key assets:
  Personal experience and status of its Members
  Access to the world's leading experts on democracy
  Specialization in democratic transition and consolidation issues
  Practical approach to its activities, through the implementation of projects with tangible results

Full Members are members of the Club de Madrid who provide their personal and political experience as former Heads of State and Government. Their appointment, based on a proposal from the Board of Directors, is approved by the General Assembly.

Direct exchanges with current leaders of countries in the process of democratic transition on a peer-to-peer basis, and the Member's ability to deliver the right message at the right time, are two of the major assets of the Club de Madrid. In this sense, the Members of the Club de Madrid can also help focus much needed international attention on targeted countries and leverage the work of other institutions trying to promote democracy.

The club's members are supported by a network of world-class experts who work together to offer assistance on a range of democratic reform issues.
The Club de Madrid is composed of four executive and advisory bodies:
  General Assembly
  Board of Directors
  General Secretariat
  Advisory Committee

Funding sources
The club is a non-profit organization and members offer their services on a pro bono basis. It relies financially on donations which are used to support a permanent secretariat and fund some specific project. The club's accounts are audited annually by an external organization.

The Club of Madrid Foundation (US)
The Club of Madrid Foundation Inc. (COMFI) is a grant-making foundation that has US 501(c)(3) tax exemption status. It exists to raise funds in support of the club's charitable and educational activities.

COMFI is independent and not controlled by the Club itself, but solely by a four-person Board of Directors, all of whom reside in the US.

Members
Several members of the Club played prominent roles in the diplomatic and military proceedings aimed at ending the wars in the former Yugoslavia during the 1990s:
 In 1991, Milan Kučan, then the President of the newly independent Slovenia, negotiated the Brijuni Agreement, bringing an end to the Ten-Day War.
 In 1993, Bosnian politician Zlatko Lagumdžija advised the then-President of Bosnia and Herzegovina against agreeing to the Vance-Owen peace plan. The two had been kidnapped by the JNA in Sarajevo in 1992, before their release was negotiated through the U.N.
 Former Polish Prime Minister Tadeusz Mazowiecki was a special U.N. emissary to Bosnia and Herzegovina in 1992 and, in 1993, issued a report on human rights violations in the former Yugoslavia. In 1995, Mazowiecki stepped down in protest of the lack of international response to the atrocities being committed in Bosnia, particularly the Srebrenica massacre.
 U.S. President Bill Clinton was instrumental in pushing NATO to intervene in Bosnia and Kosovo. In 1995, his efforts produced Operation Deliberate Force, resulting in the Dayton Accords which ended the Bosnian War. In 1999, the U.S. and other NATO powers sought to end the Kosovo War with the Rambouillet Agreement, but Yugoslavia felt that the agreement forced them to concede too much and refused to sign. This refusal resulted in Operation Allied Force, during which NATO utilized air supremacy and strategic bombing to cripple Serbian forces and force them to withdraw from Kosovo.
 Former Swedish Prime Minister Carl Bildt served as the EU's Special Envoy to the Former Yugoslavia and was a co-chairman of the Dayton Conference. He became the first High Representative for Bosnia and Herzegovina after the war, from 1995 to 1997, and was the UN Secretary-General's Special Envoy for the Balkans from 1999 to 2001.
 Other Club de Madrid members involved in the diplomatic process include the late Helmut Kohl, the former Chancellor of Germany who oversaw the reunification of East and West Germany, who was a signee to the Dayton Accords, Canadian Prime Minister Jean Chrétien, who urged support for Canada's participation in Operation Allied Force, and Finnish President Martti Ahtisaari who, along with Russian Prime Minister Viktor Chernomyrdin, convinced Serbian President Slobodan Milošević to retreat from Kosovo in accordance with NATO's demands.

List of current members
List of members as of 30 April 2022.

Member statistics
Regional background of members:
Africa and the Middle East – 19
the Americas – 29
Asia-Pacific – 16
Europe – 57

The political affiliation of members:
Socialist/Social democrat/Centre-left – 44
Centrist – 17
Liberal conservative/Christian democrat/Centre-right – 30
Conservative/Right-wing – 17
No affiliation – 13

Office held (some members have held both):
President – 71
Prime Minister – 54

List of Secretary-Generals

List of honorary members

List of members of the constituent foundations

List of former members (deceased)

See also
CC9

References

External links
 

Think tanks based in Spain
International nongovernmental organizations
Organisations based in Madrid
2001 establishments in Spain
Organizations established in 2001